Colorado Parks and Wildlife manages the state parks system and the wildlife of the U.S. state of Colorado.  , the division managed the 42 state parks and 307 wildlife areas of Colorado.

, the Colorado Natural Areas Program had 93 designated sites which protected more than 250 endangered, rare, or threatened species.

History
1937 – The state legislature appointed a land board to create the first State Parks Board.
1951 – The State Parks Board leased Cherry Creek recreation area from the Army Corps of Engineers.
1963 – State Parks was merged with the Division of Wildlife.
1971 – The State Recreational Trails Program was created.
1972 – State Parks and the Division of Wildlife were separated.
1977 – State Parks was requested to manage the snowmobile program for the state.
1984 – State Parks became responsible for licensing river outfitters.
1990 – State parks began managing the off-highway vehicle program.
1992 - Voters approved the Great Outdoors Colorado constitutional amendment directing Colorado Lottery revenues to the outdoors, including 10 percent directly to state Parks and Wildlife division. About half goes to Great Outdoors Colorado (GOCO) Trust Fund, which in turns grants money to the agency.
2011 - Colorado State Parks and the Colorado Division of Wildlife are merged into Colorado Parks and Wildlife.

, there were forty-two State Parks open to the public. In 2020, Fishers Peak, opened. Lone Mesa will open in the coming years.

The Colorado Parks and Wildlife Commission is a layman's group of eleven members who are appointed by the Governor of Colorado with legislative approval.  The Board is charged with representing various geographic regions of the state while providing oversight and setting agency policy in a democratic way to assure the agency is responsive to the citizens of Colorado. This board meets every other month to review and set policy.

See also

State of Colorado
Colorado Department of Natural Resources
List of Colorado Natural Areas
List of Colorado state parks
List of Colorado state wildlife areas

References

External links

State of Colorado
Colorado Department of Natural Resources
Colorado Parks and Wildlife

 Colorado state parks
State agencies of Colorado